Amanita mutabilis is a species of Amanita from eastern United States. Amanita mutabilis has pink tones on the cap and stem, and will turn pink when its flesh is cut; it smells of anise.

References

External links
 
 

mutabilis
Fungi described in 1919